Guwangbong (구왕봉, 九王峰) is a mountain of South Korea.

See also
List of mountains of Korea

References

Mountains of South Korea
One-thousanders of South Korea